Robyn Schiff (born January 10, 1973) is an American poet.

Life
Schiff was born in Metuchen, New Jersey. She received a BA from Sarah Lawrence College, an MA in medieval studies from University of Bristol and an MFA from the Iowa Writers' Workshop.

Her poems have appeared in Poetry, The New Yorker, The New Republic, A Public Space, Boston Review, Black Warrior Review, and elsewhere. She is the author of the poetry collections Worth and Revolver, which was a finalist for a 2008 PEN award. Her most recent book of poetry,  A Woman of Property, was published in 2016 by Penguin. In a 2014 essay in the Boston Review, poetry critic Stephen Burt described Schiff's work, along with other poets including Angie Estes, Nada Gordon, and Ange Mlinko, as "nearly Baroque."

She is co-editor of Canarium Books, and an associate professor of English at University of Iowa. She lives in Iowa City, Iowa, with her husband, poet and filmmaker Nick Twemlow, and their children.

Bibliography

Poetry

Collections

Anthologies

Poems

Critical studies and reviews of Schiff's work

References

External links
 
 

Living people
Sarah Lawrence College alumni
American women poets
1973 births
People from Metuchen, New Jersey
Iowa Writers' Workshop alumni
Alumni of the University of Bristol
The New Yorker people
21st-century American poets
21st-century American women writers